In the United States, an honor society is a rank organization that recognizes excellence among peers. Numerous societies recognize various fields and circumstances. The Order of the Arrow, for example, is the National Honor Society of the Boy Scouts of America. Chiefly, the term refers to scholastic honor societies, those that recognize students who excel academically or as leaders among their peers, often within a specific academic discipline.

Many honor societies invite students to become members based on the scholastic rank (the top x% of a class) and/or grade point averages, either overall or for classes taken within the discipline for which the honor society provides recognition. In cases where academic achievement would not be an appropriate criterion for membership, other standards are usually required for membership (such as completion of a particular ceremony or training program). Scholastic honor societies commonly add a criterion relating to the student's character. Most honor societies are invitation-only, and membership in an honor society might be considered exclusive, i.e., a member of such an organization cannot join other honor societies representing the same field.

Academic robes and regalia identifying by color the degree, school, and other distinctions, are controlled under rules of a voluntary Intercollegiate Code. In addition, various colored devices such as stoles, scarves, cords, tassels, and medallions are used to indicate membership in a student's honor society. Of these, cords and mortarboard tassels are most often used to indicate membership. Most institutions allow honor cords, tassels and/or medallions for honor society members. Stoles are less common, but they are available for a few honor societies. Virtually all, if not all honor societies have chosen such colors and may sell these items of accessory regalia as a service or fundraiser.

Many honor societies are referred to by their membership or by non-members fraternities and sororities. Honor societies exist at the high school, collegiate/university, and postgraduate levels, although university honor societies are by far the most prevalent. In America, the oldest academic society, Phi Beta Kappa, was founded as a social and literary fraternity in 1776 at the College of William and Mary and later organized as an honor society in 1898, following the establishment of the honor societies Tau Beta Pi for Engineering (1885), Sigma Xi for Scientific Research (1886), and Phi Kappa Phi for all disciplines (1897). Mortar Board was established in 1918, as the first national honor society for senior women, with chapters at four institutions: Cornell University, the University of Michigan, Ohio State University, and Swarthmore College. Later, the society became coeducational.

The Association of College Honor Societies (ACHS) is a predominantly American, voluntary association of national collegiate and post-graduate honor societies. ACHS was formed in 1925 to establish and maintain desirable standards for honor societies. While ACHS membership is a certification that the member societies meet these standards, not all legitimate honor societies apply for membership in ACHS.

Scholastic honor societies 

Notable national and international honor societies based in or at schools include the following:

General collegiate scholastic honor societies 
These societies are open to all academic disciplines, though they may have other affinity requirements.

Alpha Chi,   (all academic fields), colors:  Emerald green and  Sapphire blue
Alpha Kappa Mu,  (all academic fields)
Alpha Lambda Delta,  (freshman scholarship) 
Alpha Sigma Lambda,  (non-traditional students), colors:  Burgundy and  Gold
Alpha Sigma Nu,  (Scholarship, Loyalty and Service at Jesuit institutions of higher education), colors:  Maroon and  Gold
Chi Alpha Sigma,  (college student-athletes)
Delta Alpha Pi,  (students with disabilities)
Delta Epsilon Sigma,  (all academic fields at traditionally Catholic colleges and universities)
Delta Epsilon Tau,  (Distance Education Accrediting Commission institutions)
Epsilon Tau Pi,  (General scholarship, Eagle Scouts)
Golden Key International Honour Society (academics)
Mortar Board (Scholars chosen for Leadership united to Serve)
National Society of Collegiate Scholars,   (scholarship/leadership/service), colors:  Purple and  Gold
Phi Eta Sigma,  (freshman scholarship)
Phi Kappa Phi,  (all academic fields)
Phi Sigma Pi,  (all academic fields), colors:   Purple and  Gold
Phi Tau Phi,  (all academic fields) Republic of China 
Tau Sigma,  (transfer students)
Lambda Sigma,  (student leadership, scholarship, and service)
Order of Omega (fraternities and sororities)
Sigma Alpha Lambda,  (all academic fields)

Leadership
These societies recognize leadership, with a scholarship component; multi-disciplinary.

Mortar Board (leadership), colors:  Gold and  Silver
National Residence Hall Honorary,  (Residence hall leadership/service)
Omicron Delta Kappa,  (leadership and academic; juniors, seniors, graduate students, alumni, faculty and staff, honorary)
Sigma Alpha Lambda,  (leadership)

Military 
These are collegiate-based honor societies for students in the armed forces. Other non-collegiate honor societies serve military branches and are often listed as professional fraternities.

Arnold Air Society, (United States Air Force cadets)
Pershing Rifles, (United States armed forces)
SALUTE Veterans National Honor Society (veterans)
Scabbard and Blade, (ROTC cadets and midshipmen)

Liberal arts 
These societies are open to the traditional liberal arts disciplines and may be department-specific. Some are grouped by discipline subheading.

Alpha Kappa Delta,  (sociology), color:  Teal
Alpha Upsilon Alpha,  (reading and language arts)
Chi Sigma Iota,  (counseling)
Delta Epsilon Chi,  (divinity)
Eta Sigma Phi,  (classics)
Kappa Omicron Nu,  (human sciences), colors:  Burgundy and  Cream
Lambda Alpha,  (anthropology)
Lambda Iota Tau,  (literature)
Phi Alpha Theta,  (history)
Phi Beta Kappa,  (undergraduate arts and sciences), colors:  Pink and  Sky blue
Phi Sigma Tau,  (philosophy)
Phi Upsilon Omicron,  (Family and consumer science), colors:  Violet,  Gold and  Cream
Pi Alpha Alpha,  (public administration)
Pi Gamma Mu,  (social sciences)
Pi Sigma Alpha,  (political science)
Psi Chi,  (psychology), colors:  Navy blue and  Platinum
Sigma Iota Rho,  (international relations)
Sigma Tau Delta,  (English)
Theta Alpha Kappa, (Religious Studies/Theology/Philosophy)
Theta Chi Beta,  (religious studies)

Business

Alpha Iota Delta,  (decision sciences)
Alpha Mu Alpha,  (marketing), color:  Red
Beta Alpha Psi,  (accounting and finance)
Beta Gamma Sigma,  (AACSB accredited business programs), colors:  Gold and  Yale Blue 
Delta Mu Delta,  (ACBSP accredited business programs)
Eta Sigma Delta,  (International Hospitality Management Honor Society, ICHRIE)
Mu Kappa Tau,  (marketing)
Nu Lambda Mu,  (nonprofit management)
Omega Rho,  (operations research, management science)
Omicron Delta Epsilon,  (economics), colors:  Blue and  Gold
Sigma Beta Delta,  (business, management and administration)
Sigma Nu Tau,  (entrepreneurship)

Education

Kappa Delta Pi,  (education), colors:  Jade Green and  Violet
Pi Lambda Theta,  (education)
Pi Omega Pi,  (business education)
Phi Beta Delta,  (international education)
Eta Sigma Gamma,  (health education)

Fine arts

Alpha Psi Omega,  (theatre)
Chi Tau Epsilon,  (dance)
Delta Phi Delta,  (art)
Kappa Pi,  (art)
Kappa Kappa Psi,  (music - band)
Mu Beta Psi,  (music)
Pi Kappa Lambda,  (music)
Pi Nu Epsilon,  (music)
Tau Beta Sigma,  (music - band)
Theta Alpha Phi,  (theatre)

Journalism and communications

Kappa Tau Alpha,  (journalism/mass communication), colors:  Light blue and  Gold
Lambda Pi Eta,  (communication)
Society for Collegiate Journalists, (SCJ) (journalism)

Languages

Alpha Mu Gamma,  (foreign languages), color:  Gold
Delta Phi Alpha,  - (German), colors:  Black,  Red and  Gold
Pi Delta Phi,  (French), colors:  Blue,  White and  Red
Sigma Delta Pi,  (Spanish and Portuguese), colors:  Red and  Gold
Phi Sigma Iota,  (modern foreign languages, Classics, linguistics, philology, comparative literature, bilingual education, second language acquisition), colors:  Purple and  White

Law

The Order of Barristers (law)
Order of the Coif (law)
Phi Delta Phi, (law), colors:  Garnet and  Pearl blue
Alpha Phi Sigma, (Criminal Justice, law)
Lambda Epsilon Chi, (Paralegal)

Sciences
These societies are open to students in the STEM disciplines, and may be department-specific.  Some are grouped by discipline subheader.
Beta Beta Beta,  (biology), colors:  Blood red and  Leaf green
Beta Kappa Chi,  (natural sciences/mathematics)
Chi Beta Phi,  (science and mathematics)
Chi Epsilon Pi,  (meteorology)
Gamma Theta Upsilon,  (geography)
Gamma Sigma Epsilon,  (chemistry)
Iota Sigma Pi,  (chemistry and related fields, women's)
Phi Lambda Upsilon,  (chemistry)
Phi Sigma,  (biological sciences)
Phi Tau Sigma,  (Food Science and Technology)
Pi Epsilon,  (environmental sciences)
Sigma Gamma Epsilon,  (geology/Earth sciences), colors:  Gold,  Blue, and  Silver
Sigma Lambda Chi,  (construction management technology)
Sigma Pi Sigma,  (physics, astronomy), colors:  Forest Green and  Ivory
Sigma Xi,  (Research in Science and Engineering), colors:  Blue and  Gold
Sigma Zeta,  (natural sciences/mathematics/computer science)

Agriculture

Delta Tau Alpha, (Honor Society of Agriculture)
Gamma Sigma Delta, (Honor Society of Agriculture) colors:  Sand and  Forest Green
Pi Alpha Xi,  (horticulture), colors:  Nile green and  Cerulean blue
Xi Sigma Pi,  (forestry), colors:  Green and  Gray

Architecture
Sigma Lambda Alpha,  (landscape architecture), colors:  Gold and  Green
Tau Sigma Delta,  (architecture), colors:  White and  Gold

Engineering
Within the larger group of STEM disciplines, these societies serve engineering disciplines.

Alpha Epsilon,  (agricultural/food/biological engineering)
Alpha Eta Mu Beta,  (biomedical engineering)
Alpha Nu Sigma,  (nuclear engineering)
Alpha Pi Mu,   (industrial engineering)
Alpha Sigma Mu,  (metallurgy/materials engineering)
Chi Epsilon,  (civil engineering), colors:  Purple and  White
Eta Kappa Nu,  (electrical engineering, computer engineering), colors:  Navy blue and  Scarlet
Omega Chi Epsilon,  (chemical engineering), colors:  Maroon and  White
Phi Alpha Epsilon,  (architectural engineering)
Pi Epsilon Tau,  (petroleum engineering and related fields) colors:  Gold and   Black
Pi Tau Sigma,  (mechanical engineering), colors:  Teal and  Maroon
Rho Beta Epsilon,  (robotics), colors:  Crimson,  Gold, and  Black
Sigma Gamma Tau,  (aerospace engineering)
Tau Alpha Pi,  (engineering technology)
Tau Beta Pi,  (engineering, all types), colors:  Brown and  White
Upsilon Pi Epsilon,  (computer science/computer engineering)

Health sciences
This section includes all healthcare-related fields, including veterinary science.

 Alpha Epsilon Delta,  (pre-medical), colors: Red and  Violet
 Alpha Eta,  (allied health professions)
 Alpha Omega Alpha,  (medical students and physicians),  Forest Green,  Gold and  White
 Beta Sigma Kappa,  (Optometry)
 Delta Omega,  (public health)
 Iota Tau Alpha,  (Athletic Training)
 Nu Rho Psi,  (Neuroscience)
 Omicron Kappa Upsilon,  (Dentistry)
 Phi Zeta,  (veterinary medicine)
 Pi Delta,  (podiatry)
 Pi Theta Epsilon,  (occupational therapy)
 Rho Chi,  (pharmacy), colors:  Purple and  White
 Sigma Theta Tau,  (nursing), colors:  Orchid and  White
 Sigma Phi Alpha,  (dental hygiene)
Sigma Phi Omega, (Gerontology)
 Sigma Sigma Phi,  (osteopathic medicine) or (medicine)
 Tau Upsilon Alpha,  (human services)
 Upsilon Phi Delta,  (health administration)

Information technology
Beta Phi Mu,  (library science/information science/information technology)
Epsilon Pi Tau,  (technology)
Order of the Sword & Shield,  (homeland security, intelligence, emergency management, and all protective studies)
Upsilon Pi Epsilon,  (computer information systems, computer science)

Mathematics
 Kappa Mu Epsilon,  (mathematics)
 Mu Sigma Rho,  (statistics)
 Pi Mu Epsilon,  (mathematics)

Local honor societies 

Some universities have their own independent, open honor societies, which are not affiliated with any national or international organization. Such organizations typically recognize students who have succeeded academically irrespective of their field of study. These include:
 Aquinas Honor Society at University of St. Thomas
 Burning Spear Society at Florida State University
 Cap and Skull at Rutgers University
 Cannon and Castle at Yale University
 FHC Society at The College of William & Mary
 Florida Blue Key at University of Florida
 Friar Society at the University of Texas at Austin
 Iron Arrow Honor Society at the University of Miami
 LSV Society at the University of Missouri
 Matteo Ricci Society at Fordham University
 Owl and Key at the University of Utah
 Phalanx Honor Society at Rensselaer Polytechnic Institute, also at Clarkson University. Separate groups?
 Quill and Dagger at Cornell University
 QEBH at the University of Missouri
 Raven Society at the University of Virginia
 Society of Innocents at the University of Nebraska–Lincoln
 Skull and Bones at the Pennsylvania State University
 Skull and Dagger at University of Southern California
 Sphinx Head at Cornell University
 Dean William Tate Society at the University of Georgia
 Texnikoi Engineering Honorary at Ohio State University

Certificate, vocational, technical, and workforce education 

 Alpha Beta Kappa, 
 National Technical Honor Society

Two-year colleges and community colleges

Alpha Beta Gamma,  (business at two-year colleges)
Alpha Gamma Sigma,   (California community colleges)
Delta Psi Omega,  (theatre)
Epsilon Phi Delta,  (German at two-year colleges)
Kappa Beta Delta,  (business at Community Colleges)
Mu Alpha Theta,  (mathematics, high school and two-year colleges)
Phi Rho Pi,  (forensics at two-year colleges)
Phi Theta Kappa,  (All academic fields at community and junior colleges)
Psi Beta,  (psychology at two-year colleges)
Sigma Kappa Delta,  (English at community and junior colleges)
Sigma Zeta,  (natural sciences/mathematics/computer science - Associate membership available for community and junior colleges)
La Sociedad Honoraria de la Lengua Española (Spanish at two-year colleges)

Secondary school societies 

Commonly referred to as high school societies.

General
California Scholarship Federation
Cum Laude Society 
National Beta Club
National Honor Society (high school)
National Junior Honor Society (middle school)

Subject-specific
Computer Science Honor Society (computer science)
German National Honor Society-Delta Epsilon Phi (Deutsche Ehrenverbindung) (German)
International Thespian Society (theatre), colors:  Blue and  Gold
Mu Alpha Theta,  (mathematics)
National Art Honor Society (visual arts)
National English Honor Society (English)
National Honor Society for Dance Arts (dance)
National Junior Classical League (Latin and Greek)
National Speech and Debate Association (public speaking), colors:  Red and  Silver
National Technical Honor Society (vocational education)
Quill and Scroll (journalism)
Rho Kappa,  (social studies)
Science National Honor Society (science)
Sociedad Honoraria Hispánica (Sociedad Honoraria Hispánica) (Spanish and Portuguese)
Société Honoraire de Français (French)
Technology Student Association (STEM), colors:  Red  blue  White 
Tri-M Music Honor Society,  (music), colors:  Pink

Non-scholastic honor societies

Boy Scouts 
Order of the Arrow, National BSA Honor Society
Tribe of Mic-O-Say, Heart of America Council and Pony Express Council
Firecrafter, Crossroads of America Council

See also
Professional fraternities and sororities
Association of College Honor Societies (ACHS)
Honor Society Caucus

References

External links

 
Educational organizations based in the United States